National identity cards are issued to their citizens by the governments of all European Economic Area (EEA) member states except Denmark, Iceland and Ireland. Ireland however issues a passport card which is a valid document in the EEA and Switzerland. Denmark and Iceland issue simpler identity cards that are not valid as travel documents. From 2 August 2021, new identity cards are harmonized as a common identity card model replaced the various formats already in use.

Citizens holding a national identity card, which states citizenship of an EEA member state or Switzerland, can use it as an identity document within their home country, and as a travel document to exercise the right of free movement in the EEA and Switzerland. However, identity cards that do not state citizenship of an EEA member state or Switzerland, including national identity cards issued to residents who are not citizens, are not valid as travel documents within the EEA and Switzerland.

Use

Travel document
As an alternative to presenting a passport, EEA and Swiss citizens are entitled to use a valid national identity card as a stand-alone travel document to exercise their right of free movement in the European Economic Area and Switzerland. National identity card ownership in most EU countries and Switzerland is much more widespread than passport ownership.

When travelling within the Nordic Passport Union, no identity documentation is legally required by Nordic citizens. When travelling within the Common Travel Area, other valid identity documentation (such as a driving licence) is often sufficient for Irish and British citizens.

At present, Denmark and Iceland do not issue identity cards that are valid as travel documents in the EEA member states and Switzerland. Strictly speaking, it is not necessary for an EEA or Swiss citizen to possess a valid national identity card or passport to enter the EEA and Switzerland. In theory, if an EEA or Swiss citizen can prove their nationality by any other means (e.g. by presenting an expired national identity card or passport, or a citizenship certificate), they must be permitted to enter the EEA and Switzerland. An EEA or Swiss citizen who is unable to demonstrate their nationality satisfactorily must, nonetheless, be given 'every reasonable opportunity' to obtain the necessary documents or to have them delivered within a reasonable period of time.

Additionally, EEA and Swiss citizens can enter the following countries and territories outside the EEA and Switzerland on the strength of their national identity cards alone, without the need to present a passport to the border authorities:

Turkey allows citizens of Belgium, Bulgaria, France, Germany, Greece, Hungary, Italy, Liechtenstein, Luxembourg, Malta, Netherlands, Poland, Portugal, Spain and Switzerland. Egypt allows citizens of Belgium, France, Germany, Italy, and Portugal to enter using a national identity card for short-term visits. Tunisia allows nationals of Austria, Belgium, France, Germany, Italy, Luxembourg, Netherlands, Portugal, Spain, Sweden, and Switzerland to enter using a national identity card if travelling on an organized tour. Anguilla, Dominica, and Saint Lucia allow nationals of France to enter using a national ID card, while Dominica de facto also allows nationals of (at least) Germany and Sweden to enter with a national ID card (as of March 2016). Gambia allows nationals of Belgium to enter using a national ID card. The United Kingdom and the Crown Dependencies only allows EEA (except Irish) and Swiss citizens fulfilling specific requirements to use national identity cards (though to enter at the land border Ireland-Northern Ireland, no specific document requirements apply). Greenland allows Nordic citizens to use any identification document containing a photo, while citizens from the rest of EU/EFTA must carry a passport.

Although, as a matter of European law, holders of a Swedish national identity card are entitled to use it as a travel document to any European Union member state (regardless of whether it belongs to the Schengen Area or not), Swedish national law did not recognise the card as a valid travel document outside the Schengen Area until July 2015 in direct violation of European law. What this meant in practice was that leaving Schengen directly from Sweden (i.e., without making a stopover in another Schengen country) with the card was not possible. This partially changed in July 2015, when travel to non-Schengen countries in the EU (but not outside, even if the destination country accepts the ID card) was permitted.

Similarly, Finnish citizens cannot leave Finland directly for a non-EU/EFTA country with only their ID cards.

Additional checks for some citizens 
At the external border crossing points of the Schengen Area, if a traveller presents a travel document without a machine readable zone and the border guard has 'doubt about his/her identity', the traveller may be requested to undergo a more in-depth 'second line' check. In practice, this means that Greek citizens who present a Greek identity card and Italian citizens who present an Italian paper identity card could be subject to additional checks and delay when entering/leaving the Schengen Area.

With effect from 7 April 2017, it is mandatory for border guards in the Schengen Area to check on a systematic basis the travel documents of all EEA and Swiss citizens crossing external borders against relevant databases. Until 7 April 2017, border guards in the Schengen Area were only obliged to perform a 'rapid' and 'straightforward' visual check for signs of falsification and tampering, and were not obliged to use technical devices – such as document scanners, UV light and magnifiers – when EEA and Swiss citizens presented their passports or national identity cards at external border checkpoints. They were not legally obliged to check the passports/national identity cards of EEA and Swiss citizens against a database of lost/stolen/invalidated travel documents (and, if they did so, they could only perform a 'rapid' and 'straightforward' database check, and could only check to see if the traveller was on a database containing persons of interest on a strictly 'non-systematic' basis where such a threat was 'genuine', 'present' and 'sufficiently serious').

According to statistics published by Frontex, in 2015 the top 6 EU member states whose national identity cards were falsified and detected at external border crossing points of the Schengen Area were Italy, Spain, Belgium, Greece, France and Romania. These countries remained the top 6 in 2016.

Identification document

Usage in own country
There are varying rules on domestic usage of identity documents. Some countries demand the usage of the national identity card or a passport. Other countries allow usage of other documents like driver's licences.

In some countries, e.g. Austria, Finland and Sweden, national identity cards are fully voluntary and not needed by everyone, as identity documents like driving licences are accepted domestically. In these countries only a minority have a national identity card, since a majority have a passport and a driving licence and don't need more identity documents. This is also true for Ireland where those who have a passport and a driving licence have less need for the passport card. The passport card can be used for travel to 31 countries in the European Union, European Economic Area including Switzerland.

However, even in those EEA countries that impose a national identity card requirement on their citizens (above certain age), it is generally not required to carry the identity cards at all times.

Usage outside own country
EEA and Swiss citizens exercising their right of free movement in another EEA member state or Switzerland are entitled to use their national identity card as an identification document when dealing not just with government authorities, but also with private sector service providers. For example, where a supermarket in The Netherlands refuses to accept a German national identity card as proof of age when a German citizen attempts to purchase an age-restricted product and insists on the production of a Dutch-issued passport or driving licence or other identity document, the supermarket would, in effect, be discriminating against this individual on this basis of their nationality in the provision of a service, thereby contravening the prohibition in Art 20(2) of Directive 2006/123/EC of discriminatory treatment relating to the nationality of a service recipient in the conditions of access to a service which are made available to the public at large by a service provider. In those EEA countries whose citizens are required by law to obtain a national identity card, only a minority have a passport, since it is not needed for travelling across much of Europe.

Usage in third countries
National identity cards are often accepted in other parts of the world for unofficial identification purposes (such as age verification in commercial establishments that serve or sell alcohol, or checking in at hotels) and sometimes for official purposes such as proof of identity and nationality to authorities (especially machine-readable cards).

As of 1 July 2021, EEA (except Irish) passports and identity cards are no longer accepted to prove the right to rent in the United Kingdom, so EEA citizens are required to provide evidence of lawful immigration status.

Common design and security features

European Union standards from 2006 
On 13 July 2005, the Justice and Home Affairs Council called on all European Union member states to adopt common designs and security features for national identity cards by December 2005, with detailed standards being laid out as soon as possible thereafter.

On 4 December 2006, all European Union member states agreed to adopt the following common designs and minimum security standards for national identity cards that were in the draft resolution of 15 November 2006:

Material 
The card can be made with paper core that is laminated on both sides or made entirely of a synthetic substrate.

Biographical data 
The data on the card shall contain at least: name, birth date, nationality, a photo, signature, card number, and end date of validity. Some cards contain more information such as height, eye colour, start date of validity, sex, issue place or province, and birthplace.

Machine readable data 
The biographical data on the card is to be machine readable and follow the ICAO specification for machine-readable travel documents.

The EU Regulation revising the Schengen Borders Code (which entered into force on 7 April 2017 and introduced systematic checks of the travel documents of EU, EEA and Swiss citizens against relevant databases when entering and leaving the Schengen Area) states that all member states should phase out travel documents (including national identity cards) which are not machine-readable.

However, as of 2021, Greece continues to issue solely non-machine readable identity cards, while Italy is in the process of phasing out the issuing of non-machine readable paper booklets in favour of biometric cards. In Europe, Greece was one of the last countries which continued using ID's without a machine readable zone which were not in line with the latest ICAO guidelines.

Electronic identity cards 
All EEA electronic identity cards should comply with the ISO/IEC standard 14443. Effectively this means that all these cards should implement electromagnetic coupling between the card and the card reader and, if the specifications are followed, are only capable of being read from proximities of less than 0.1 metres.

They are not the same as the RFID tags often seen in stores and attached to livestock. Neither will they work at the relatively large distances typically seen at US toll booths or automated border crossing channels.

The same ICAO specifications adopted by nearly all European passport booklets (Basic Access Control - BAC) means that miscreants should not be able to read these cards unless they also have physical access to the card. BAC authentication keys derive from the three lines of data printed in the MRZ on the obverse of each TD1 format identity card that begins "A", "C", or "I".

According to the ISO 14443 standard, wireless communication with the card reader can not start until the identity card's chip has transmitted a unique identifier. Theoretically an ingenious attacker who has managed to secrete multiple reading devices in a distributed array (eg in arrival hall furniture) could distinguish bearers of MROTDs without having access to the relevant chip files. In concert with other information, this attacker might then be able to produce profiles specific to a particular card and, consequently its bearer. Defence is a trivial task when most electronic cards make new and randomised UIDs during every session [NH08] to preserve a level of privacy more comparable with contact cards than commercial RFID tags.

The electronic identity cards of Austria, Belgium, Estonia, Finland, Germany, Italy, Liechtenstein, Lithuania, Portugal, Slovakia and Spain all have a digital signature application which, upon activation, enables the bearer to authenticate the card using their confidential PIN. Consequently they can, at least theoretically, authenticate documents to satisfy any third party that the document's not been altered after being digitally signed. This application uses a registered certificate in conjunction with public/private key pairs so these enhanced cards do not necessarily have to participate in online transactions.

An unknown number of national European identity cards are issued with different functionalities for authentication while online. Some also have an additional contact chip containing their electronic signature functionality, such as the Swedish national identity card.

Portugal's card had an EMV application but it was removed in newer versions from 16 January 2016.

New European Union standards from 2019 

A new common format of electronic identity document is intended to replace and harmonize the various identity card models currently in use across the European Union (EU) and the European Economic Area (EEA). In accordance with its own laws, any Member State of the Union shall issue an identity card complying with the requirements of Regulation (EU) 2019/1157 of the European Parliament and of the Council of 20 June 2019 on strengthening the security of identity cards of Union citizens and of residence documents issued to Union citizens and their family members exercising their right of free movement, and articles 3/4/5 state that:

 Identity cards shall be produced in ID-1 format and shall contain a machine-readable zone (MRZ). 
 Security standards shall be based on ICAO Document 9303. 
 The document shall bear the title ‘Identity card’ in the official language and in at least one other official language of the institutions of the Union. 
 It shall contain the two-letter country code of the Member State issuing the card, printed in negative in a blue rectangle and encircled by 12 yellow stars on the front side. 
 It shall include a highly secure storage medium which shall contain a facial image of the holder of the card and two fingerprints in interoperable digital formats. The storage medium shall have sufficient capacity and capability to guarantee the integrity, the authenticity and the confidentiality of the data. The data stored shall be accessible in contactless form and secured as provided for in Implementing Decision (European Union) C(2018) 7767.
 Identity cards shall have a minimum period of validity of 5 years and a maximum period of validity of 10 years. But Member States may provide for a period of validity of less than 5 years for minors and more than 10 years for persons aged 70 and above.
 Identity cards which do not meet the new requirements shall cease to be valid at their expiry or by 3 August 2031.
 Identity cards which do not meet the minimum security standards or which do not include a functional MRZ shall cease to be valid at their expiry or by 3 August 2026.
 Identity cards of persons aged 70 and above at 2 August 2021, which meet the minimum security standards and which have a functional MRZ shall cease to be valid at their expiry.

Article 16 states that this Regulation shall apply from 2 August 2021.

For several member countries the new requirements do not mean that the design or features of the existing cards change much, since they mostly fulfil the requirements already. For some this means a large redesign. A visible change for all countries is the country code inside the EU flag.

Identity cards not meeting the new requirements shall cease to be valid at their expiry or by 3 August 2031, whichever comes sooner. Identity cards which do not meet the minimum security standards or which do not include a functional machine-readable zone shall cease to be valid by 3 August 2026. Identity cards of persons aged 70 and above on 2 August 2021 which meet the minimum security standards and which have a functional MRZ shall cease to be valid at their expiry.

In addition, the new EU Regulation cannot be applied to travel documents like the passport card issued by Ireland, as stated at point (14) of the introduction chapter.

Implementation throughout the member states is ongoing with various timetables on a per-country basis. Cyprus began issuing identity cards conforming to the harmonised requirements as early as August 2020, becoming the first country to implement the new standard. It was followed by Malta the same month. France started pilot testing the new document in select departments in March 2021, with a wider, progressive rollout planned for the following months.

Overview of national identity cards
Member states issue a variety of national identity cards with differing technical specifications and according to differing issuing procedures.

See also
 Passports of the European Union
 Citizenship of the European Union
 Visa requirements for European Union citizens
 Schengen Area
 European Economic Area
 European Free Trade Association
 List of national identity card policies by country
 Identity document
 European driving licence
 Internal passport
 European Health Insurance Card

Notes

References

External links
 National identity cards in PRADO (The Council of the European Union Public Register of Authentic Travel and Identity Documents Online)

European Economic Area
Authentication methods
International travel documents
European Economic Area